Hilary Ewing Howse (1866–1938) was an American businessman and politician. He served as the Mayor of Nashville from 1909 to 1913, and again from 1923 to 1938.

Early life
Howse was born in 1866 in Rutherford County, Tennessee.

Career
Howse served as a member of the Tennessee Senate from 1905 and again in 1909, and later as Mayor of Nashville from 1909 to 1913, and again from 1923 to January 2, 1938.

Howse was an anti-prohibitionist and is attributed to the quote, "As long as I stay in a free country, I will eat and drink as I please."

Death
Howse died on January 2, 1938. He was buried in Mount Olivet Cemetery.

References

1866 births
1938 deaths
People from Rutherford County, Tennessee
Tennessee state senators
Mayors of Nashville, Tennessee
Burials at Mount Olivet Cemetery (Nashville)